Paris — Palais des Congrès: Intégrale du spectacle is a 1995 live album featuring the performers Charles Aznavour and Liza Minnelli, recorded at the Palais des congrès de Paris.

The album features two full sets from the performers, with Minnelli and Aznavour also performing together on several tracks.

Reception
The Allmusic review by William Ruhlmann awarded the album four stars out of five stating that "...There's little here one hasn't heard before from Aznavour and Minnelli, so the best moments are the ones when they work together."

Track listing
 Prologue" – 1:40
 "Sound of Your Name" (Charles Aznavour, Herbert Kretzmer) – 4:31
 "Mon émouvant amour" (Aznavour) – 5:51
 "Les Comédiens" (Aznavour, Jacques Plante) – 3:14
 "Sa jeunesse" (Aznavour) – 4:58
 "Napoli Chante" (Aznavour, Georges Garvarentz) – 5:16
 "Vous et tu" (Aznavour) – 3:54
 "La Marguerite" (Aznavour, Garvarentz) – 5:04
 "Tu t'laisses aller" (Aznavour) – 4:08
 "Non je n'ai rien oublié" (Aznavour, Garvarentz) – 6:42
 "Je bois" (Aznavour, Garvarentz) – 3:37
 "Comme ils disent" (Aznavour) – 4:41
 "Les Plaisirs démodés" (Aznavour, Garvarentz) – 4:30
 "La Bohème" (Aznavour, Plante) – 5:23
 "Je m'voyais déjà" (Aznavour) – 5:33
 "Pour faire une jam" (Aznavour) – 6:41
 "Bonjour Paris" (Roger Edens, Kay Thompson) – 3:04
 "God Bless the Child" (Arthur Herzog, Jr., Billie Holiday) – 3:28
 "Old Friend" (Stephen Sondheim) – 3:04
 "Liza with a Z" (Fred Ebb, John Kander) – 3:48
 "Sailor Boys" (Aznavour, Kretzmer) – 5:12
 "Some People" (Sondheim, Jule Styne) – 3:53
 "J'ai deux amours" (Georges Koger, John Murray, Vincent Scotto, Barry Trivers, Henri Eugene Vantard) – 5:02
 "Stepping Out" (Ebb, Kander) – 7:54
 "Losing My Mind" (Sondheim) – 4:07
 "I Love a Piano" (Irving Berlin) – 6:52
 "Cabaret" (Ebb, Kander) – 3:56
 "Theme from New York, New York" (Ebb, Kander) – 4:18
 "Medley" – 15:43

Personnel

Charles Aznavour - vocals
Liza Minnelli - vocals

References

1995 live albums
Liza Minnelli live albums
Charles Aznavour live albums